Stradley and Barr Dry Goods Store in Greenville, South Carolina was listed on the National Register of Historic Places in 2008.

References

Commercial buildings on the National Register of Historic Places in South Carolina
National Register of Historic Places in Greenville, South Carolina